Albert Charles Paul Marie Roussel (5 April 1869 – 23 August 1937) was a French composer. He spent seven years as a midshipman, turned to music as an adult, and became one of the most prominent French composers of the interwar period. His early works were strongly influenced by the impressionism of Debussy and Ravel, while he later turned toward neoclassicism.

Biography 

Born in Tourcoing (Nord), Roussel's earliest interest was not in music but mathematics. He spent time in the French Navy, and in 1889 and 1890, he served on the crew of the frigate Iphigénie and spent several years in southern Vietnam. These travels affected him artistically, as many of his musical works would reflect his interest in far-off, exotic places.

After resigning from the Navy in 1894, he began to study harmony in Roubaix, first with Julien Koszul (grandfather of composer Henri Dutilleux), who encouraged him to pursue his formation in Paris with Eugène Gigout; Roussel then continued his studies until 1908 at the Schola Cantorum de Paris, where one of his teachers was Vincent d'Indy. While studying, Roussel also taught. His students included Erik Satie and Edgard Varèse.

During World War I, Roussel served as an ambulance driver on the Western Front. Following the war, he bought a summer house in Normandy and devoted most of his time there to composition.

Starting in 1923, another of Roussel's students was Bohuslav Martinů, who dedicated his Serenade for Chamber Orchestra (1930) to Roussel.

His sixtieth birthday was marked by a series of three concerts of his works in Paris; the  concerts also included the performance of a collection of piano pieces, Homage to Albert Roussel, written by several composers, including Ibert, Poulenc, and Honegger.

Roussel died in Royan, in 1937, and was buried in the churchyard of Saint Valery in Varengeville-sur-Mer.

Compositions 

By temperament Roussel was predominantly a classicist. While his early work was strongly influenced by impressionism in music, he eventually arrived at a personal style which was more formal in design, with a strong rhythmic drive, and with a more distinct affinity for functional tonality than is found in the work of his more famous contemporaries Debussy, Ravel, Satie, and Stravinsky.

Roussel's training at the Schola Cantorum, with its emphasis on rigorous academic models such as Palestrina and Bach, left its mark on his mature style, which is characterized by contrapuntal textures. On the whole Roussel's orchestration is rather heavy compared to the subtle and nuanced style of other French composers like Debussy or, indeed, Gabriel Fauré. He preserved something of the romantic aesthetic in his orchestral works, and this sets him apart from Stravinsky and Les Six.

He was also interested in jazz. This interest led to his writing a piano-vocal composition entitled Jazz dans la nuit, which was similar in its inspiration to other jazz-inspired works such as the second movement of Ravel's Violin Sonata, or Milhaud's La création du monde.

Roussel's most important works were the ballets Le festin de l'araignée, Bacchus et Ariane, and Aeneas and the four symphonies, of which the Third in G minor, and the Fourth in A major, are highly regarded and epitomize his mature neoclassical style. His other works include numerous ballets, orchestral suites, a piano concerto, a concertino for cello and orchestra, a psalm setting for chorus and orchestra, incidental music for the theatre, and much chamber music, solo piano music, and songs.

Critical reception 
In 1929, one French critic, Henry Prunières, described Roussel's search for his own voice:

Arturo Toscanini included the suite from the ballet Le festin de l'araignée in one of his broadcast concerts with the NBC Symphony Orchestra. Rene Leibowitz recorded that suite in 1952 with the Paris Philharmonic, and Georges Prêtre recorded it with the Orchestre National de France for EMI in 1984.

One brief assessment of his career says:

One 21st-century critic, in the course of discussing the Third Symphony, wrote:

The Albert Roussel Collection 
The association Les Amis belges d'Albert Roussel (The Belgian Friends of Albert Roussel) was founded in 1979 by André Peeters. In 1986 the association donated a collection of Roussel-linked documents to the Music Division of the Royal Library of Belgium, thus creating the most important collection of archival sources on the composer outside of France. The collection contains many unique documents including a dozen musical manuscripts, autographs, around 250 letters (100 of them unpublished), a travel diary, recordings (including most of the early recordings of his compositions), iconography, a large collection of press clippings, programs and other documents linked to Roussel's works and life.

Works

Stage
  (The Sandman), incidental music for a verse play by Jean-Aubry, Le Havre, 16 December 1908, Op. 13
 Le festin de l'araignée, ballet in one act. f.p. 3 April 1913, Op. 17
 Padmâvatî, opera in 2 acts (1913–18, Louis Laloy, after T.-M. Pavie). f.p. Paris Opéra, 1 June 1923, Op. 18
 La naissance de la lyre, opera in 1 act, Paris Opéra, 1 July 1925, Op. 24
 Sarabande (1927; for the children's ballet L'éventail de Jeanne, to which ten French composers each contributed a dance)
 Bacchus and Ariadne (ballet), ballet in two acts. f.p. Paris Opéra, 22 May 1931, Op. 43
 Aeneas, ballet for chorus and orchestra, Op. 54, 1935
 Le testament de la tante Caroline, opera in 3 acts, 14 November 1936
 Prelude to Act 2 of Le Quatorze juillet by Romain Rolland, Paris, 14 July 1936
 Elpénor, for chamber ensemble, radio score, 1947, Op. 59 (LAST FINISHED OPUS – 1937)

Orchestral
 Résurrection, Prelude for orchestra Op. 4 (1903)
 Symphony No. 1 in D minor The Poem of the Forest, Op. 7 (1904–1906)
 Evocations, for orchestra, mezzo-soprano, tenor, baritone and chorus, Op. 15 (1910–11)
 Padmâvatî Suites (Nº 1 & 2), Op. 18 (1918) 
 Pour une fête de printemps, Op. 22, symphonic poem (1920)
 Symphony No. 2 in B-flat major, Op. 23 (1919–1921)
 Suite for Orchestra in F major, Op. 33 (1926)
 Concert for small orchestra, Op. 34 (1926–1927)
 Petite Suite, Op. 39 (1929)
 Symphony No. 3 in G minor, Op. 42 (1929–30), commissioned by the Boston Symphony for its 50th anniversary
 Sinfonietta for String Orchestra, Op. 52 (1934)
 Symphony No. 4 in A major, Op. 53 (1934)
 Rapsodie flamande, Op. 56 (1936)

Concertante
 Piano Concerto in G major, Op. 36 (1927)
 Cello Concertino, Op. 57 (1936)

Choral
 Psalm 80 for tenor, choir, and orchestra, Op. 37 (1928)

Solo vocal works
 Quatre poèmes, Op. 3 (1903)
 Quatre poèmes, Op. 8 (1907)
 La Ménace, Op. 9 (1907–1908)
 Flammes, Op. 10 (1908)
 Deux Poèmes chinoises, Op. 12 (1908)
 Deux Mélodies, Op. 19 (1918)
 Deux Mélodies, Op. 20 (1919)
 Deux Poèmes de Ronsard, Op. 26 (1924)
 Odes anacréontiques, Op. 31 (1926)
 Odes anacréontiques, Op. 32 (1926)
 Deux poèmes chinoises, Op. 35 (1927)
 Vocalise (1927)
 Jazz dans la nuit, Op. 38 (1928)
 Vocalise-étude (1928)
 A Flower Given to My Daughter (1931)
 Deux Idylles, Op. 44 (1932)
 Deux Poèmes chinoises, Op. 47 (1932)
 Deux Mmélodies, Op. 50 (1934)
 Deux Mélodies, Op. 55 (1935)

Chamber/instrumental
 Piano Trio in E-flat, Op. 2 (1902, rev. 1927)
 Divertissement for piano and wind quintet, Op. 6 (1906)
 Violin Sonata No. 1 in D minor, Op. 11 (1907–1908)
 Impromptu, for harp, Op. 21 (1919)
 Joueurs de flûte, for flute and piano, Op. 27 (1924)
 Violin Sonata No. 2 in A major, Op. 28 (1924)
 Segovia, for guitar, Op. 29 (1925)
 Duo, for bassoon and contrabass, without opus (1925)
 Serenade for flute, string trio, and harp, Op. 30 (1925)
 Trio, for flute, viola, and cello, Op. 40 (1929)
 String Quartet, Op. 45 (1931–1932)
 Andante and Scherzo, for flute and piano, Op. 51 (1934)
 Pipe, for piccolo & piano, without opus (1934)
 String Trio, Op. 58 (1937)
 Andante from an unfinished wind trio, for oboe, clarinet, and bassoon (1937)

Piano solo
 Des heures passent, Op. 1 (1898)
 Conte à la poupée (1904)
 Rustiques, Op. 5 (1906)
 Suite in F-sharp minor, Op. 14 (1910)
 Petite canon perpetuel (1913)
 Sonatine, Op. 16 (1914)
 Doute (1919)
 L'Accueil des Muses [in memoriam Debussy] (1920)
 Prelude and Fugue, Op. 46 (1932)
 Three Pieces, Op. 49 (1933)

Recordings
 Symphonies 1–4 – Orchestre National de France/Charles Dutoit (Apex – Erato Records)
 Symphonies 1–4 – Orchestre Philharmonique de Radio France/Marek Janowski (RCA Victor Red Seal)
 Symphonies 1–4 and Ariadne et Bacchus – Royal Scottish National Orchestra/Stéphane Denève (Naxos Records)
 Symphony No. 3 – New York Philharmonic/Leonard Bernstein (Sony Classical)
 Symphony No. 4 – Philharmonia Orchestra/Herbert von Karajan (EMI)
 Symphony No. 2, Aeneas, Bacchus, Spider's Feast – ORTF/Jean Martinon (Erato)
 Symphonies Nos. 3 & 4 – Paris Conservatoire Orchestra/André Cluytens (Angel Records)
 Padmavati (opera) – London Symphony Orchestra/Jean Martinon (BBC)
 Padmavati – Marilyn Horne, Nicolai Gedda, Michel Plasson conducting (EMI)
 Complete Chamber Music – Members of the Schönberg Quartet, 3 CDs (Brilliant Classics)
 Intégrale de l'œuvre pour piano – Alain Raës
 Les Mélodies – Complete Solo Vocal Works (Marie Devellereau, soprano/Yann Beuron, tenor/Laurent Naouri, piano/Billy Eidi, piano/Luxembourg Philharmonic Orchestra/cond. Jean-Yves Ossonce)
 Trio for Flute, Viola and Cello, Op 40 (Boston Records B-208) Doriot Anthony Dwyer, Flute, Joseph de Pasquale, Viola, Samuel Mayes, Cello

See also
 Festival international Albert-Roussel
 List of ambulance drivers during World War I
 Marcel Gaumont Sculptor on composer's tomb

Notes

References and further reading
 Nicolas Slonimsky, ed., The Concise Edition of Baker's Biographical Dictionary of Musicians, 8th ed. (NY: Schirmer Books, 19930, 
 Damien Top, Albert Roussel 1869–1937, un marin musicien (Paris: Séguier, 2000)
 Damien Top, "Albert Roussel", collection Horizons, (Paris: Bleu Nuit, 2016) 
 Henry Doskey, The Piano Music of Albert Roussel (Indiana University, 1981)
 Basil Deane, Albert Roussel (London: Barrie & Rockliff, 1962; Greenwood Press Reprint, 1980)
 Norman Demuth, Albert Roussel: A Study (United Music Publishers, 1946. Westport, CT: Hyperion Press, 1979)

External links

1869 births
1937 deaths
19th-century classical composers
19th-century French composers
19th-century French male musicians
20th-century classical composers
20th-century French composers
20th-century French male musicians
Concert band composers
French ballet composers
French classical composers
French male classical composers
French opera composers
Male opera composers
People from Tourcoing
Pupils of Eugène Gigout
Pupils of Vincent d'Indy
Schola Cantorum de Paris alumni
Composers for harp